The Lawrenceville School is a coeducational preparatory school for boarding and day students located in the Lawrenceville section of Lawrence Township, in Mercer County, New Jersey, United States. Lawrenceville is a member of the Eight Schools Association, Ten Schools Admissions Organization, and a former member of the G20 Schools group.

Overview
As of the 2017–18 school year, the school had an enrollment of 817 students and 109 classroom teachers (on an FTE basis), for a student–teacher ratio of 7.5:1. The school's student body was 55.0% (449) White, 21.3% (174) Asian, 9.9% (81) Black, 7.8% (64) two or more races and 6% (49) Hispanic.

In 2010, Lawrenceville announced that Janie Woods, who died at age 87 in 2007, and her husband, Henry C. Woods Jr., had bequeathed the school $60 million. In 2017, Head Master Stephen Murray announced to the school community that Joseph C. Tsai, Class of 1982 and executive vice chairman of global e-commerce company, Alibaba Group, and his wife Clara had donated the largest gift in the school's 207-year history. As of June 2019, the school's endowment stood at $487.2 million.

Lawrenceville received 2,046 formal applications for entry in fall 2018, of which 421 were offered admission, giving an acceptance rate of 20.5%.

The school is accredited by the Middle States Association of Colleges and Schools.

History
One of the oldest preparatory schools in the United States, Lawrenceville was founded in 1810 as the Maidenhead Academy by Presbyterian clergyman Isaac Van Arsdale Brown. As early as 1828, the school attracted students from Cuba and England, as well as from the Cherokee Nation. It had several names, including the Lawrenceville Classical and Commercial High School, the Lawrenceville Academy, and the Lawrenceville Classical Academy, before its current name, "The Lawrenceville School," was adopted during its refounding under the John Cleve Green Foundation in 1883. An  area of the campus built then, including the Hamill House and numerous other buildings, has been designated a U.S. National Historic Landmark District.  This portion of the campus includes buildings designed to a master plan by Peabody and Stearns, with landscape design by Frederick Law Olmsted.  An addition to the campus outside of that district was built in the 1920s. Lawrenceville's student body was almost entirely white for its first 150 years, with the first African American student admitted in 1964.

Lawrenceville was featured in several novels by Owen Johnson, class of 1895, notably The Prodigious Hickey, The Tennessee Shad, and The Varmint (1910). The Varmint, which recounts the school years of the fictional character Dink Stover, was made into the 1950 motion picture The Happy Years, starring Leo G. Carroll and Dean Stockwell, and was filmed on the Lawrenceville campus. A 1986 PBS miniseries was based on Johnson's Lawrenceville tales.

Among Lawrenceville's prominent teachers over the years have been Thornton Wilder, a three-time Pulitzer Prize–winning author who taught French at the School in the 1920s; R. Inslee Clark Jr., who revolutionized Ivy League admissions at Yale in the 1960s; and Thomas H. Johnson, a scholar of early American poetry.

Lawrenceville was all-male until the Board of Trustees voted to make the school coeducational in 1985. The first girls were admitted in 1987, and 178 of the 725 students were female during the 1987-88 school year. In 1999, the student body elected a female president, Alexandra Petrone; in 2003, Elizabeth Duffy was appointed the School's first female headmaster; and in 2005, Sasha-Mae Eccleston, Lawrenceville Class of 2002 and Brown University Class of 2006, became Lawrenceville's first alumna to win a Rhodes Scholarship.

Lawrenceville was also formerly the world record holder for the largest custard pie fight.

In its 2016 rankings, Business Insider ranked the school's tuition as the 22nd most expensive private high school in the United States. In its 2015 rankings the year before, Business Insider had ranked the school's tuition as the 2nd most expensive private high school tuition in the United States, with tuition and fees of $48,700 behind the $49,092 charged by Connecticut's Salisbury School. In the publication's five years of rankings, that was the first time Lawrenceville was not the top-ranked school.

Historic Landmark

The Lawrenceville School National Historic Landmark is a  historic district on the campus of the Lawrenceville School. This portion, the old campus area built in 1894–1895, was designed jointly by the landscape designer Frederick Law Olmsted and the architects Peabody & Stearns. A new campus area, built in the 1920s, does not intrude and is not included in the district.

The district was declared a National Historic Landmark in 1986.  It is included in the Lawrence Township Historic District, created in 1972.

School heads
Heads of school include:

 Isaac Van Arsdale Brown, 1810-1834
 Alexander Hamilton Phillips, 1834-1837
 Samuel McClintock Hamill, 1837-1883
 James Cameron Mackenzie, 1883-1899
 Simon John McPherson, 1899-1919
 Mather Almon Abbott, 1919-1934
 Allan Vanderhoef Heely, 1934-1959
 Bruce McClellan, 1959-1986
 Josiah Bunting III, 1987-1995
 Philip Harding Jordan Jr., 1995-1996
 Michael Scott Cary, 1996-2003
 Elizabeth Anne Duffy, 2003-2015
 Stephen Sheals Murray, 2015–present

Campus
The Lawrenceville School sits across U.S. Route 206, or Main Street, from the center of Lawrenceville.

The school includes a golf course that, as of 2023, is currently closed due to construction, and owns much of the land to its east, which is classified as Green Space under New Jersey state law.

Residential life 

Lawrenceville utilizes a house system, similar to many British schools. Students reside in four distinct groups of Houses—the Lower School, the Crescent, the Circle, and the Fifth Form (Senior) Houses—as do a number of faculty members associated with each House. There are also a certain number of faculty homes located on the campus.

Publications
The school's weekly, student-run newspaper, The Lawrence, is the third oldest secondary school newspaper in the United States, after The Phillipian and The Exonian, Phillips Academy Andover's and Phillips Exeter Academy's weeklies, respectively. The Lawrence has been published regularly since 1881. Students make up the editorial board and all decisions for the paper, consulting with two faculty advisors at their discretion.

In the fall of 2014, L10 News, the school's weekly ten-minute newscast, was founded on The Lawrenceville School's YouTube Channel and Facebook page. The program format features a series of headlines, and three to four main stories from Lawrenceville, ranging from interviews with newsmakers, sports, arts, and special event coverage. L10 News is run by an editorial board composed of students and a faculty advisor. It is created by a team of student reporters, videographers, and video editors. As of 2017, the show had over 117,000 unique views on Facebook and YouTube.

Other student-run publications include The First Amendment, a monthly political magazine founded in 2010; The Ledger, a semesterly business magazine; LMAG, a semesterly fashion magazine; In the Margins, a Diversity magazine; The Contour, a newspaper on global issues; The Lawrenceville Historical Review, the school's annual history periodical; El Artículo, a Spanish publication, and The Lit, a literary magazine published three times a year. The Lit was founded in 1895 by author Owen Johnson, who went on to write the Lawrenceville Stories. Also published annually are the Olla Podrida, the yearbook; Lawrencium, the science research journal; and Prize Papers, a compilation of the best academic work in the English Department by that year's IV Form (junior) class. There is also a WLSR radio club.

Athletics 

Lawrenceville's rival is The Hill School of Pottstown, Pennsylvania, against which it competes as one of six schools in the Mid-Atlantic Prep League. On the first or second weekend of November during "Hill Weekend," the two schools celebrate the nation's eighth-oldest high school football rivalry and fifth-oldest school rivalry in the nation, dating back to 1887.

Lawrenceville competes with other schools in baseball, basketball, crew, cross-country, fencing, field hockey, football, golf, hockey, indoor and outdoor track, lacrosse, soccer, softball, squash, swimming, tennis, volleyball, water polo, and wrestling. In addition, the School offers a variety of intramural sports, including Ultimate Disc for the girls' Crescent Houses and 8-man flag football for the boys' Circle Houses. The athletic directors of Lawrenceville and the other members of the Eight Schools Association compose the Eight Schools Athletic Council, which organizes sports events and tournaments among ESA schools.

Athletic achievements
In the spring of 2015, the Lawrenceville Boys' Varsity Crew team won the MAPL League Championship, beating out Peddie, Hun, and Blair; placed first at the US Rowing Mid-Atlantic Youth Championship; and then went on to place 4th at the US Rowing Youth Nationals held in Camden, NJ. The crew was selected for the Henley Royal Regatta and is widely regarded as the greatest crew in the school's history. Multiple members of this crew either went on to race for the United States Jr. National Team or row at D1 universities such as Cal, Wisconsin, Yale, Georgetown, and Northeastern. or the United States Jr. National Development Team. In the fall of 2010, the Lawrenceville Boys' Varsity Crew team won the Head of the Christina Regatta in Delaware, then placed 14th in a field of 75 at the Head of the Charles Regatta in Boston, Massachusetts, later in the season.

In the spring of 2008, the Lawrenceville Boys' and Girls' Varsity Track and Field team completed its season undefeated, placing first in the NJISSAA and MAPL. In winter 2011, the 4x200 team was the fastest in the nation, earning each one of them the status of All-American. By January 2014, the Lawrenceville boys' varsity track team had won 103 dual meets in a row; the boys' team has not lost a dual meet, a Prep State A championship, or the MAPL championship since 2006. In winter 2014, the 4x55 Shuttle Hurdle Relay team was ranked #2 in New Jersey and #3 in the nation.

On November 6, 2005, the Lawrenceville Girls' Varsity Field Hockey team defeated Stuart Country Day School 2-1 to capture their third straight Prep A state championship. On November 5, 2006, the Varsity Field Hockey team defeated Stuart Country Day School 1-0 to capture their fourth straight Prep A state championship. In 2007 they tied rival Stuart Country Day School for a shared victory in their fifth straight Prep A state championship with a 2-2 tie on a late Lawrenceville goal.

On February 12, 2006, the Lawrenceville Varsity Boys' Squash team won the National Championship for the third year in a row.

On May 18, 2006, the Lawrenceville Boys' Varsity Baseball Team won the New Jersey State Prep A Championship over Peddie School in a doubleheader (14-0 and 6-1), earning their second state championship in three years. Lawrenceville defeated Peddie again in the 2010 finals to win its second consecutive Prep A title.

Facilities 

There are 38 major buildings on Lawrenceville's  campus, including the Bunn Library, which has space for 100,000 volumes. Peabody and Stearns designed the original campus of the school, which included Memorial Hall (renamed Woods Memorial Hall in January 2010), a gymnasium, the headmaster's house, five dorms, and future plans for the chapel.

The four Crescent House dorms, Stanley, McClellan, Stephens, and Kirby, designed by Short and Ford Architects of Princeton, New Jersey, were opened in 1986, with a fifth Crescent House, Carter, opened in 2010. The Circle Houses, declared a national historic landmark, were designed by Frederick Law Olmsted.

Lawrenceville has 18 athletics fields, a nine-hole golf course which is currently closed due to contruction, 12 outdoor tennis courts,  all-weather and indoor tracks, a boathouse, a hockey arena, and a ropes and mountaineering course.  During the summer, Lawrenceville is a popular site for youth sports camps and several academic programs for students and teachers, including the New Jersey Scholars Program.

The school has also recently begun contruction on a new facility which will accomodate dining and athletics.

In the spring of 2012, the School began to draw its energy needs from a solar farm, which consists of a nearly 30-acre, net-metered, 6.1-megawatt solar facility. The area also has several honey-producing bee hives, part of the Big Red Farm, which ring the perimeter of the array.

The big red farm includes three greenhouses, 4 acres of tilled land, and 20 acres of pasture. It includes sheep, chickens, and pigs.

Affiliations
Lawrenceville athletics compete in the Mid-Atlantic Prep League.

Lawrenceville is a member of a group of leading American secondary schools, the Eight Schools Association, which began informally in 1973–74 and was formalized at a 2006 meeting at Lawrenceville. At that meeting, Choate headmaster Edward Shanahan was appointed as the first president, Lawrenceville's Elizabeth Duffy was named first vice president, and former Lawrenceville chief financial officer William Bardel was hired as the executive assistant. Shanahan was succeeded in 2009 by Duffy, and former Hotchkiss head Robert Mattoon succeeded Bardel. The member schools are Lawrenceville, Choate Rosemary Hall, Deerfield Academy, The Hotchkiss School, Northfield Mount Hermon, Phillips Academy (known as Andover), Phillips Exeter Academy (known as Exeter), and St. Paul's School.

Lawrenceville is also a member of the Ten Schools Admissions Organization, established in 1966 and comprising Lawrenceville, Choate, Deerfield, Hotchkiss, Andover, Exeter, St. Paul's, Taft School, Loomis Chaffee, and The Hill School.

Lawrenceville is affiliated with The Island School in Cape Eleuthera, The Bahamas, to which it sends students for semesters abroad.

Gallery

Notable alumni 

Lawrenceville has many notable alumni, prominent in public life in America and abroad, including author and ecologist Aldo Leopold (1904-1905), former President of Honduras Ricardo Maduro, Congressman Patrick Murphy, federal judge J. Harvie Wilkinson III, and former Senator and Governor of Connecticut Lowell P. Weicker Jr.

Other prominent alumni include Obama press secretary Jay Carney; the musicians Huey Lewis and Dierks Bentley; socialite & Real Housewife of New York Tinsley Mortimer, the writers Owen Johnson, James Merrill, and Frederick Buechner; business executives Disney CEO Michael Eisner, Alibaba Vice Chairman Joseph Tsai, former Mobil president Rawleigh Warner Jr., and former Forbes publisher Malcolm Forbes; athletes Joakim Noah and Bobby Sanguinetti; and academics, including the literary and media theorist Laurence A. Rickels, Nobel-Prize-winning economist George Akerlof, Harvard Law School Professor Charles Fried, and Bill Berkson, poet, critic, and teacher; and Episcopal priest Walter S. Cox; screenwriter Merian C. Cooper.

Notable faculty
 R. Inslee Clark Jr. (1935–1999), Director of Undergraduate Admissions at Yale University
 Bill Littlefield, author and host of the NPR radio series Only a Game
 Thornton Wilder (1897–1975), playwright and novelist
Samuel Cochran (1871-1952), medical missionary and philanthropist

References

External links 

 
 The Association of Boarding Schools profile
 Data for the Lawrenceville School, National Center for Education Statistics

Boarding schools in New Jersey
1810 establishments in New Jersey
Educational institutions established in 1810
Lawrence Township, Mercer County, New Jersey
National Historic Landmarks in New Jersey
Peabody and Stearns buildings
Preparatory schools in New Jersey
Private high schools in Mercer County, New Jersey
Co-educational boarding schools
National Register of Historic Places in Mercer County, New Jersey
Historic districts on the National Register of Historic Places in New Jersey